Erysiphe graminis f.sp. tritici is a plant pathogen that causes a fungal infection known as powdery mildew. It is most common in grains, and it can be identified by the characteristic white spots on leaves and stems that appear to be made of powder. Powdery mildew is one of the most widespread and easily recognizable plant diseases.

E. graminis is an obligate parasite, meaning that it cannot be grown on an artificial medium. This species has been confused with Blumeria graminis, but in 1975, the new taxa Blumeria was created just for that species. Blumeria and Erysiphe are different in their digitate haustoria and in details of their conidial wall.

References

External links
 USDA ARS Fungal Database

Fungal plant pathogens and diseases
graminis f.sp. tritici
Forma specialis taxa